The Russell Top 50 Index measures the performance of the largest companies in the Russell 3000 Index. It includes approximately 50 of the largest securities based on a combination of their market cap and current index membership and represents approximately 40% of the total market capitalization of the Russell 3000.

The index, which was launched on January 1, 2005, is maintained by FTSE Russell, a subsidiary of the London Stock Exchange Group. Its ticker symbol is ^RU50.

Investing
Prior to January 27, 2016, the index was tracked by an exchange-traded fund, the Guggenheim Russell Top 50 Mega Cap ETF. The ETF switched to the S&P 500 Top 50 Index.

Top 10 holdings
Apple Inc.
Microsoft Corp
Amazon.com
Meta Platforms
Alphabet Inc Cl A
Alphabet Inc Cl C
Berkshire Hathaway Inc
Johnson & Johnson
Procter & Gamble
Visa Inc.
(as of October 31, 2020)

Top sectors by weight
 Technology
 Consumer Discretionary
 Health Care
 Industrials
 Financials

See also
S&P 100
Russell Investments
Russell 2000 Index
Russell 1000 Index
Russell Top 200 Index

References

External links 
Russell Indexes
Russell Investment Group
Index Construction and Methodology
Yahoo! Finance page for ^RU50

American stock market indices